Calandra is a genus of beetles in the weevil family, the Curculionidae.

References

External links 

 Calandra at insectoid.info

Dryophthorinae
Curculionidae genera